is a retired Japanese speed skater. He competed at the 1964, 1968 and 1972 Winter Olympics in the 500 m and 1500 m events with the best result of fifth place in the 500 m in 1964. He set two world records in the 500 m event in 1969–70.

Suzuki took the Athlete's Oath at the 1972 Winter Olympics in Sapporo.

World records 

Source: SpeedSkatingStats.com

References

External links

 
 

1942 births
Living people
Japanese male speed skaters
Speed skaters at the 1964 Winter Olympics
Speed skaters at the 1968 Winter Olympics
Speed skaters at the 1972 Winter Olympics
Olympic speed skaters of Japan
World record setters in speed skating
World Sprint Speed Skating Championships medalists
Oath takers at the Olympic Games
20th-century Japanese people